Paul Harris Boardman is an American screenwriter and film producer, best known for his work in the horror genre. Boardman has also written other screenplays for various studios and production companies, including TriStar, Disney, Bruckheimer Films, IEG, APG, Sony, Lakeshore, Screen Gems, Universal and MGM.

Early life 
Boardman grew up in the Appalachian region of Southwest Virginia and East Tennessee, and graduated Phi Beta Kappa from Sewanee with honors degrees in English literature and psychology. At Sewanee, he was the editor, a columnist, and a cartoonist for the university newspaper (The Sewanee Purple), and he played wide receiver on the football team. Boardman earned an M.A. in creative writing from Johns Hopkins University, and also studied at St John's College, Oxford, and the University of Southern California School of Cinematic Arts.

Career 
After writing his first feature scripts while still a student at USC's School of Cinematic Arts, Boardman began working with fellow screenwriter Scott Derrickson, working as a script doctor on Dracula 2000 and co-writing Urban Legends: Final Cut, and he also co-wrote and directed the second unit for Derrickson's directorial debut Hellraiser: Inferno, a direct-to-video sequel to the long-running horror franchise. Boardman was the co-writer and producer of The Exorcism of Emily Rose (2005), Derrickson's critically praised follow-up film. He has also worked on production rewrites of The Messengers, Scream 4, and Poltergeist.  Boardman produced the 2008 remake of The Day the Earth Stood Still for Fox. He wrote and produced Devil's Knot, about the West Memphis Three, based on the book by Mara Leveritt, which had its world premiere at the 2013 Toronto Film Festival, and was released in 2014. In addition, Boardman wrote The Substitute for producer Sam Raimi, Mandate, and Columbia Pictures, and he wrote a suspense thriller, The Living, for Lakeshore Entertainment, which he was also attached to produce. 

Boardman was co-writer and executive producer on Thunderstruck, a sci-fi drama pilot for AMC, and he co-wrote and was attached to executive produce a drama pilot for MTV.  Boardman also adapted Stephen King's The Tommyknockers for The Konigsberg/Sanitsky Company and NBC.

In October 2011, it was announced that Boardman would co-write the horror-thriller Two Eyes Staring for Summit Entertainment, starring Charlize Theron, who is also attached to produce.  In September 2012, it was announced that Boardman will adapt the James Patterson bestseller Guilty Wives for Maven Pictures, and he will also executive produce the film.

Boardman co-wrote and executive produced the supernatural thriller Deliver Us from Evil for Screen Gems and producer Jerry Bruckheimer. It began filming in June 2013 and was released on July 2, 2014. In October 2020, it was announced that Netflix had greenlit the supernatural horror series Archive 81, which Boardman wrote and developed based on the popular podcast created by Marc Sollinger and Daniel Powell, and Boardman will executive produce.

Boardman's other screenplays in development include The Birds for Universal Pictures, Mandalay Pictures, and Platinum Dunes, and Tom Slick, Mystery Hunter for Storyscape Entertainment and Teakwood Lane Productions.

Filmography

Notes

References 
Fleming, Michael (2004-9-23). "Linney in Line for 'Exorcism'". Variety. Retrieved 2012-8-8. 
Siegel, Tatiana (2007-11-5). "'Earth' Welcomes Jennifer Connelly". Variety. Retrieved 2012-8-8.
Ford, Rebecca (2013-10-7). "Image Picks Up West Memphis Three Pic 'Devil's Knot'". Hollywood Reporter. Retrieved 2013-11-26.
Graser, Marc (2009-10-1). "Spooky Haunts Family Audiences". Variety. Retrieved 2012-8-8.
McNary, Dave (2009-10-18). "Lakeshore taps 'The Living' director". Variety. Retrieved 2012-8-8.
Gallagher, Brian (2011-11-11). "AMC picks up 'Thunderstruck'". Movieweb.com. Retrieved 2012-8-8.
Kit, Borys (2011-10-18). "Charlize Theron Horror Thriller to be Directed by Scott Derrickson". Hollywood Reporter. Retrieved 2012-8-8.
Kit, Borys (2012-9-6). "James Patterson Novel Getting Movie Adaptation from 'Emily Rose' Writer". Hollywood Reporter. Retrieved 2012-9-10.
Turek, Ryan (2013-11-13). "Sinister Director's 'Beware the Night' Moves into 2014". Shock Till You Drop. Retrieved 2013-11-19.
Porter, Rick (2020-10-26). "Netflix Snags 'Archive 81' Horror Series Based on Podcast". Hollywood Reporter. Retrieved 2021-7-4.

External links

Interview with Paul Harris Boardman about 'Emily Rose'
The Exorcism of Emily Rose: Interview with Paul Harris Boardman and Scott Derrickson

Living people
American male screenwriters
American film producers
Sewanee: The University of the South alumni
Johns Hopkins University alumni
Alumni of St John's College, Oxford
USC School of Cinematic Arts alumni
Screenwriters from Tennessee
Year of birth missing (living people)